CEDR may refer to:

 The Centre for Effective Dispute Resolution, London, UK
 The Conference of European Directors of Roads (Conférence Européenne des Directeurs des Routes), Brussels